Wuhan Optics Valley Football Club is a defunct football club that was located in the city of Wuhan, Hubei province, China. The club's home stadium was Xinhua Road Sports Center, while the important matches were played at the more modern stadium Wuhan Sports Center in China. Their fans were mainly from Hubei province and the club had supporters from the city of Wuhan, and the surrounding cities of Ezhou, Huangshi, and Xiaogan. It was founded in 1954 as the Hubei Football Team, while the professional football team was founded in February 1994. In 2008, the club quit the Chinese Super League because of what it believed to be unfair punishment after the club had a dispute with the Chinese Football Association over the club's on-field behaviour against Beijing Guoan in a league game. Some of its players formed a new team called Hubei Luyin and made a return to Chinese Super League in 2013.

History

Hubei Football Team
The club was formed in 1954 by the local Hubei province sports body to take part in China's national football league tournament. They entered the league in the 1955 season and finished 10th. After several years struggling within the division, the club found themselves in the second tier by the 1958 season. After achieving a fourth-place finish they were promoted to the top division. By 1960 the club had renamed themselves the Hubei Football Team and for a short period they adapted better within the league. By the end of the 1963 season the club were relegated to the second division until the Chinese Cultural Revolution saw football in China halted. When football returned in 1973 the club were allowed to enter straight back into the top tier. From then on the club predominantly remained a top division team. They narrowly missed out on winning their first league title to Bayi Football Team on goal difference in the 1986 league season. They could not improve upon that result and were relegated at the end of the 1988 league season. In response to this failure the local Hubei government pushed for better representation within the league pyramid, and several new teams were formed in the Hubei region.

Professionalism
While the club was in the second tier, the Chinese Football Association were starting to demand full professionalism throughout the league. Hubei football team decide to merge with the Wuhan Football Team to form a fully professional unit in February 1994 and be the sole representative of the Hubei region in the Chinese league pyramid. With former player Yin Lihua as their manager the club gradually improved their league standings and won the second tier title at the end of the 1997 league season.

The club's time in the top tier did not last very long and they were soon relegated back into the second tier. They brought in Pei Encai as their new manager in 2004. He won the division title and promotion in his debut season. Back within the top tier of the rebranded Chinese Super League, the team were led-out by local players such as Li Hao, Zheng Bin and Zhang Xinxin. Their foreign contingent of Brazilians such as Emerson Roberto Conceicao Aleixo, Gílson Domingos Rezende Agostinho, and Vicente de Paula Neto helped the club to a seven-game winning streak early in the season. Pei Encai was hired away by the Chinese women's football team. Chen Fangping came in as the new manager during the season and carried on Pei Encai's work. Despite several injuries to some key players the club were able to win the 2005 Chinese Super League Cup by beating Shenzhen Jianlibao 3–1 on aggregate after a 1:1 away match and 2:0 home match fixture.

After his brief stint as the Chinese women's team coach, Pei Encai returned to the club. He again promoted local talent by including defenders Ai Zhibo and Cai Xi and midfielders Zhou Yi and Chinese U-23 player Zhou Heng on the team. However, he was unable to achieve the same success upon his return and the club finished tenth. In the following season youngsters Deng Zhuoxiang, Chinese U-23 players Zeng Cheng, Rong Hao and Di You joined the BBC team. Rong Hao and Di You suffered knee injuries during the season. Despite finishing seventh Pei Encai and the club decided to part way s and Chen Fangping was brought back in as a manager at the beginning of the 2008 Chinese Super League. His use of inappropriate tactics led the club quickly into the relegation zone, and he was soon sacked. Former Chinese football team manager Zhu Guanghu was then brought in to change the club's fortunes around. He decided that the club needed to strengthen their defence and brought in Chinese international Li Weifeng for three million yuan.

Disbandment
On 27 September 2008 the club were playing the eighteenth league game out of thirty against Beijing Guoan when Li Weifeng and Beijing player Lu Jiang had a scuffle on the field. The Chinese FA decided to issue each player with an eight match ban and a fine of 1,170 USD. Wuhan chairman Shen Liefeng refused to accept the punishment and threatened to quit the Chinese football league and sought legal advice. On 1 October 2008, the club and the Chinese FA could not come to an agreement. The club decided to quit the league. With Wuhan quitting the Chinese Super League, they were fined a further 44,000 USD by the Chinese FA, had all their matches awarded 3–0 against them, and were banned from entering any further league seasons in any division. All the senior players were either sold or loaned out. The local Hubei government took over the club's youth team and formed a new club called Hubei Luyin to take part at the bottom of the Chinese league system within the third tier at the beginning of the 2009 league season.

Name history

1954–1993 Hubei
1994–1995 Hubei WISCO
1996 Hubei Mailyard
1997–1998 Wuhan Yaqi
1999–2000 Wuhan Hongtao K (武汉红桃K)
2001 Wuhan Hongjinlong
2002 Wuhan Donghu Hi-Tech
2003 Wuhan Guoce Bluestar
2004–2005 Wuhan Huanghelou
2006–2008 Wuhan Optics Valley.

Managerial history
Managers who have coached the team since the club became a professional unit back in 1994.

  Ding Sanshi (1994–95)
  Yin Lihua (1995–98)
  Park Jong-hwan (1998)
  Qi Wusheng (1998–99)
  Hu Zhigang (1999)
  Zhu Bo (interim) (April 1999 – July 99)
  Milorad Kosanović (1999)
  Yin Lihua (2000–01)
  Liu Wuyi (2001–03)
  Pei Encai (July 2003 – May 5)
  Chen Fangping (2005)
  Pei Encai (Dec 2005 – Sept 07)
  Chen Fangping (2007–08)
  Zhu Guanghu (2008)

Honours
All-time honours list including semi-professional period.

League
 Chinese Jia-B League / China League One (Second Tier League)
 1980, 1997, 2004

Cups
 Chinese Super League Cup
 2005

Reserve Team
 Reserve League Champions
 2008

Results
All-time League Rankings

As of the end of 2008 season.

No league games in 1959, 1966–72, 1975;
 In final group stage.  In second group stage.  In group stage.

Key
 Pld = Played
 W = Games won
 D = Games drawn
 L = Games lost
 F = Goals for
 A = Goals against
 Pts = Points
 Pos = Final position

 DNQ = Did not qualify
 DNE = Did not enter
 NH = Not Held
- = Does Not Exist
 R1 = Round 1
 R2 = Round 2
 R3 = Round 3
 R4 = Round 4

 F = Final
 SF = Semi-finals
 QF = Quarter-finals
 R16 = Round of 16
 Group = Group stage
 GS2 = Second Group stage
 QR1 = First Qualifying Round
 QR2 = Second Qualifying Round
 QR3 = Third Qualifying Round

See also
 Hubei Luyin F.C.

References

External links
Official website 
Fans Official website 

Defunct football clubs in China
Sport in Wuhan
Football clubs in China
Association football clubs established in 1994
Association football clubs disestablished in 2008
1994 establishments in China
2008 disestablishments in China